Paa is a Ghanaian masculine given name. Notable people with the name include:

Paa Grant (1878–1956), Ghanaian politician
Paa Joe (born 1947), Ghanaian artist
Paa Kwesi Nduom (born 1953), Ghanaian politician
Paa Nii Lutterodt (1937–2006), Ghanaian international football player

African masculine given names
Ghanaian culture